The 2014 Iowa Hawkeyes football team represented the University of Iowa in the 2014 NCAA Division I FBS football season. They were led by 16th-year head coach Kirk Ferentz and played their home games at Kinnick Stadium. They were a member of the new West Division of the Big Ten Conference. They finished the season 7–6, 4–4 in Big Ten play to finish in fourth place in the West Division. They were invited to the TaxSlayer Bowl where they lost to Tennessee.

2014 commitments

Schedule

Source:

Roster

Game summaries

Northern Iowa

Source: Box Score

Future NFL star David Johnson had almost 250 yards of total offense for Northern Iowa but it still wasn't enough to upset host Iowa. The Panthers never went away and kept the game close until the final minutes, but a Hawkeye touchdown in the fourth quarter put the game out of reach.

Ball State

Source: Box Score

Iowa State

Source: Box Score

at Pittsburgh

Source: Box Score

at Purdue

Source: Box Score

Indiana

Source: Box Score

at Maryland

Source: Box Score

Northwestern

Source: Box Score

Mark Weisman ran for 94 yards and three touchdowns and freshman Akrum Wadley ran for 106 yards and a touchdown in this blowout victory for Iowa. The Hawkeyes dominated on both sides of the ball as Northwestern's lone touchdown was assisted by a muffed punt.

at Minnesota

Source: Box Score

at Illinois

Source: Box Score

Wisconsin

Source: Box Score

Nebraska

Source: Box Score

vs. Tennessee (TaxSlayer Bowl)

Source: Box Score

The Volunteers scored touchdowns on their first four possessions to take a commanding 28–0 lead early in the 2nd quarter en route to a 35–7 halftime advantage. The Hawkeyes, alternating quarterbacks each of their first six possessions, struggled to find a rhythm on offense until late in the game. Tennessee now leads the series between the two teams, 2–1.

Postseason Awards
Brandon Scherff – Big Ten Offensive Lineman of the Year, Winner of the Outland Trophy, presented to the nation's best interior lineman, and Unanimous First-team All-American.

Players in the 2015 NFL Draft

References

Iowa
Iowa Hawkeyes football seasons
Iowa Hawkeyes football